Eldar Salihović (born 17 June 1999) is a Montenegrin alpine skier. 
He competed in giant slalom at the 2018 and 2022 Winter Olympics.

References

External links

1999 births
Living people
Montenegrin male alpine skiers
Olympic alpine skiers of Montenegro
Alpine skiers at the 2018 Winter Olympics
Alpine skiers at the 2022 Winter Olympics
Alpine skiers at the 2016 Winter Youth Olympics